The Invisible Front is a 1932 German spy thriller film directed by Richard Eichberg and starring Trude von Molo, Karl Ludwig Diehl, Veit Harlan and Paul Hörbiger. The story was written by Robert A. Stemmle, Curt Siodmak and Max W. Kimmich, who also presented the idea to this film to his colleagues. It was made at the Johannisthal Studios in Berlin and on location in Hamburg. The film's sets were designed by the art directors Artur Günther and Willi Herrmann.

The location shooting started on 7 October 1932, while the studio shooting began only two weeks later, on 21 October 1932. The final movie passed censorship on 22 December 1932 and made its debut just a day later in Berlins Capitol cinema.

Plot 
During World War I, young Ellen Lange runs away from her boarding school in Hamburg, because she cannot stand its strict rules any longer, and escapes to her brother Rolf, who lives in Kiel. Rolf, a vice-helmsman by profession, is not too enthusiastic about Ellen's arrival, because he has to go to England by secret orders. So he tries to convince her to go back to her boarding school, and when they both separate at the station, he is convinced that she will do so. But Ellen is unwilling to give up her new freedom again, so she takes another train to Berlin instead. During the journey, she meets a young girl that promises to help her find a job in Berlin. She also provides Ellen with the address of "Aunt Jenny", a dubious lady who finally gets her a job in a music store. After her three months of probation, Mr. Hansen, her boss, orders Ellen to bring a precious violin to Copenhagen. He also provides her with a false passport, as Ellen does not have any identity papers.

Only after her arrival at Copenhagen, Ellen learns that she has not only transported the violin, but also secret strategic papers that were stolen in Berlin. She also meets Erik Larsen, a German secret service agent who works under cover at the Lyra publishing house, that in fact is a centre of the enemy's espionage ring. After that, she decides to work for the German secret service to make up for her fault. As a first step, after returning to Berlin, she tells the German counterespionage about the music shop in Copenhagen, which is rounded up shortly afterwards. Then Ellen learns that the papers she smuggled out of the country lead to the destruction of her brother's submarine. Deeply affected by his death, she gives in to Larsen to take on to another spying order with him which leads them both via Copenhagen to London. When they are invited to a ball at the American military delegation there, Ellen manages to distract Colonel Stanley long enough for Larsen to search the colonel's desk and to steal important papers from it. But when the boss of Lyra publishing house arrives at the party, he recognizes her and gets her arrested. During a German airship attack, Larsen is able to free her again, but while the two are attempting to escape, in a final irony Ellen is fatally injured by the fragment of a German bomb.

Cast
 Karl Ludwig Diehl as Erik Larsen 
 Trude von Molo as Ellen Lange 
 Alexa Engström as Mabel May 
 John Mylong as Rolf Lange 
 Theodor Loos as Henrik Thomsen 
 Helmuth Kionka as Fred Holger 
 Paul Otto as Capt. William Roberts 
 Erik Werntgen as Oberleutnant Brown 
 Veit Harlan as Friseur Jonny 
 Ernst Dernburg as Oberst John Stanley 
 Michael von Newlinsky as Oberleutnant Wilton 
 Paul Bildt as Prof. Hardy 
 Werner Pledath as Chef des deutschen Geheimdienstes in Berlin 
 Paul Hörbiger as Kommisssar Borgmann 
 Willi Schur as Paul Hansen 
 Rosa Valetti as Tante Jenny 
 Trude Berliner as Trude 
 Vera Witt as Vorsteherin des Pensionats 
 Otto Kronburger as Kriminalkommissar 
 Harry Hardt as Kriminalkommissar 
 Carl Auen as Kapitänleutnant des U-Bootes 
 Horst Obermüller as Kapitänleutnant eines andern U-Botes 
 Viktor de Kowa
 Edith Meinhard
 F.W. Schröder-Schrom
 Ida Wüst

References

Bibliography
 Kester, Bernadette. Film Front Weimar: Representations of the First World War in German films of the Weimar Period (1919-1933). Amsterdam University Press, 2003.

External links

Klaus, Ulrich J. German sound films. Film encyclopedia of full-length German and German-speaking sound films, sorted by their German first showings. - Ulrich J. Klaus - Berlin [et al.]. (Klaus-Archive, Vol. 3, 1932)

1932 films
1930s spy films
World War I spy films
German spy films
Films of the Weimar Republic
Films directed by Richard Eichberg
German black-and-white films
Films shot at Johannisthal Studios
Universal Pictures films
Films shot in Hamburg
1930s German films